Anil's Ghost is the critically acclaimed fourth novel by Michael Ondaatje. It was first published in 2000 by McClelland and Stewart.

Anil's Ghost follows the life of Anil Tissera, a native Sri Lankan who left to study in Britain and then the United States on a scholarship, during which time she has become a forensic pathologist. She returns to Sri Lanka in the midst of its merciless civil war as part of a human rights investigation by the United Nations. Anil, along with archaeologist Sarath Diyasena, discovers the skeleton of a recently murdered man in an ancient burial ground which is also a government-protected zone. Believing the murder to be politically motivated, Anil and Sarath set out to identify the skeleton, nicknamed Sailor, and bring about justice for the nameless victims of the war.

Plot
The story opens up in early March as Anil arrives in Sri Lanka after a 15-year absence abroad. Her visit comes as a result of the increasing number of deaths in Sri Lanka from all the warring sides in the 1980s' civil war. While on an expedition with archeologist Sarath, Anil notices that the bones of a certain skeleton do not seem to be 6th century like the rest which leads her to conclude that the skeleton must be a recent death. Unsure where Sarath's political allegiance lies, Anil is skeptical of his help, but agrees to it anyway.

Along their journey to identify the skeleton, nicknamed Sailor, Anil becomes increasingly suspicious of Sarath. She begins to question his motives and sees his comments as a hint for her to censor herself since their discovery would implicate the Sri Lankan government in the death of Sailor. Later, Anil and Sarath visit his former teacher, Palipana, hoping to have him confirm their suspicions. Palipana then suggests having a reconstruction of the face done so that others might identify him. They agree to do so and head on to a small village named Galapitigama.

There Anil meets Sarath's brother, Gamini, an emergency doctor. She discovers that he is intricately involved in the country's affairs and daily struggles to save the lives of numerous victims. Gamini helps them with a fellow Sri Lankan whose hands have been nailed to a road, and tells them about the various atrocities citizens face as a result of the civil war. Later Anil and Sarath meet with Ananda, on the advice of Palipana, hoping that he will be able to reconstruct the face of Sailor for them. Ananda does so after some days, despite Anil's impatience and skepticism, and then almost immediately attempts suicide, only to be rescued by an intuitive and quick-thinking Anil.  Anil and Sarath eventually are able to identify Sailor in a small village.

As Anil prepares a report to present to the authorities, claiming the skeleton as a recent death, and therefore evidence of state or state-sponsored terrorism, the skeleton of Sailor disappears. Frustrated, she goes on with her presentation, using another skeleton, but is upset when Sarath arrives after a lengthy and mysterious absence to ridicule her efforts and claim that she cannot back up her claims with the skeleton she has.  Angry and betrayed, on her way out Anil is frequently stopped and inspected, and her belongings and research seized, such that by the time she leaves the building she is left with nothing.  Outside, she meets Sarath, who surprises her with the body of Sailor that he has placed in a van.  Sarath instructs Anil to prepare a fake report for the government and then leave the country the next morning on a plane that he arranged. Relieved, Anil does so in the hope that the evidence will be sufficient.  Sarath's actions, however, have severe consequences, leading ultimately to his death. The novel ends with Ananda sculpting the eyes of a Buddha statue.

Main characters
Anil Tissera is a young Sri Lankan woman who has been absent from her homeland for many years.  A forensic pathologist, she returns to Sri Lanka with an international human rights organization in order to research various murders that are connected to the civil war.  Anil works alongside a local official, Sarath. Together they are determined to discover the identity of Sailor, a murder victim's skeleton. Throughout the novel, there are various references to Anil's life in America as well as in Sri Lanka. In Sri Lanka she had been a prodigal swimmer but left to pursue an education in the west.  During her stay in America, she became involved in a relationship with a married man, Cullis. The narrative often refers back to this doomed relationship as she tries to cope with the destruction in Sri Lanka.
Sarath Diyasena is a local official who works with Anil to investigate the string of murders in Sri Lanka.  His character often seems distant and tortured due to his personal history.  His wife died and the narrative later confirms that she committed suicide.  Additionally, his political affiliations are ambiguous throughout a majority of the novel and it is unclear if he is a friend or foe to Anil's investigation.  During their investigation, Sarath seeks guidance from a former teacher, Palipana.  By the conclusion of the novel, Sarath can be seen as a martyr.  He places his own safety in jeopardy to assure Anil's investigation and so his loyalty to justice and morality are validated.
Palipana is an epigraphist and a former teacher to Sarath. Palipana lives much like a hermit in what appear to be ruins near Anuradhapura, an ancient capital of Sri Lanka, with his niece. Though he is now blind he had once been Sarath's most challenging instructor.  Anil and Sarath seek guidance from him with their investigation and he instructs them to find a sculptor/painter to recreate Sailor's face. 
Ananda was once a sculptor and painter who partook in a traditional ceremony of painting eyes on statues to give them life.  However he is now a drunk, due to the disappearance of his wife, Sirissa, amidst the other atrocities of the war.  He is hired by Anil and Sarath to recreate Sailor's face.  Ananda often clashes with Anil but helps her nonetheless to give the anonymous victim a face and identity.  When Ananda finally completes the recreation of the face he gives it a peaceful face because that is the peace he wishes for his disappeared wife.  Shortly after the face's completion, he slashes his throat in a suicidal attempt, only to be rescued by Anil's and Sarath's efforts.
Gamini, also known as "The Mouse", is Sarath's younger brother. He is an efficient doctor, who since a young age has been living in Sarath's shadow.  He helps Anil and Sarath care for a man named Gunesena who they found brutally wounded on a road.  Gamini had been in love with Sarath's wife and attended to her when she was rushed to the hospital during her suicide.  He was there with her when she died.  After being left by his own wife he spends the vast majority of his time in the Emergency Services department of the hospital, even sleeping there. He is also addicted to speed.

Structure and strategies

Personal anecdotes

Anil's Ghost follows a unique structure in which the novel is divided into eight sections: "Sarath", "Grove of Ascetics", "A Brother", "Ananda", "The Mouse", "Between Heartbeats", "The Life Wheel", and "Distance".  Each section corresponds to a narrative that deals primarily with a specific subject or character as denoted by the section's title. Additionally, most of the sections are introduced by an italicized personal anecdote about one of the characters related or unrelated to the section. Characters or events are introduced although the actual novel's narrative will not discuss them until later sections. Events from the past are usually unaddressed by the novel and are described within these anecdotes. Most of the anecdotes are told by a third person narrator from the perspective of one of the characters. This creates a sense of urgency for the individual experiences depicted in the anecdotes that lies in contrast to the rest of the novel.  The sense of urgency expressed in the anecdotes mirrors the urgency of individuals involved in the war who remain voiceless victims of war crimes.  They all have individual stories of their own related to the war that remain untold.

Symbols

One of the important symbols in the novel is the skeleton that Anil and Sarath try to identify, Sailor. Sailor's skeleton is the only real evidence that Anil has that would implicate the government in the murder. Sailor serves as a symbol for all of the nameless victims of the civil war. Like the countless victims, Sailor has been burned beyond recognition and his identity has been lost. His remains serve as the only clue that Anil and Sarath have to bring justice to the victims. Anil and Sarath's fight to identify Sailor is a fight to bring a voice to stop war.

Another symbol is Ananda's reconstructed head of Sailor. Ananda sculpts Sailor's head into a peaceful expression, symbolic of the peace that Ananda wishes for his wife and for the rest of his country. The juxtaposition between the tranquil looking head and its decapitated state is also symbolic of the chaos and death that surrounds Sri Lanka. At once Ananda wishes for peace, and yet no matter how much he tries, that peace is artificial. The reconstructed head at the same time can be seen as the naming of victims: "There was a serenity in the face she did not see too often these days. There was no tension. A face comfortable with itself."

Finally, Anil and Sarath are able, with Ananda's help, to bring a voice to the victim: "[T]his head was not just how someone possibly looked, it was a specific person. It revealed a distinct personality, as real as the head of Sarath."

Setting and historical context
Ondaatje set Anil's Ghost in his homeland of Sri Lanka. During the turbulent period in Sri Lanka from the mid-1980s to early 1990s, the characters in Anil's Ghost face the everyday struggles of living in a warring nation. During this time period, Sri Lanka is divided among three main warring sides with two ethnic groups and the government in a civil war. The novel places a major focus on war and its effects on individuals, families, and entire societies. Families have been torn apart because of the kidnappings or simply because of the stress of war that is too much of a burden.

Major awards
Anil's Ghost is a recipient of the Governor General's Award for English-language fiction in 2000, and the Giller Prize.

References

2000 Canadian novels
Novels by Michael Ondaatje
Novels set in Sri Lanka
Scotiabank Giller Prize-winning works
McClelland & Stewart books
Governor General's Award-winning fiction books
Nonlinear narrative novels